Baloki is a village in Nakodar in Jalandhar district of Punjab State, India. It is located 16.5 km from Nakodar, 51 km from Kapurthala, 41.6 km from district headquarter Jalandhar and 162 km from state capital Chandigarh. The village is administrated by a sarpanch who is an elected representative of the village. It was a jagir ruled by Kang Jats.

Transport 
Nakodar railway station is the nearest train station however, Jalandhar city train station is 44 km away from the village. The village is 70.6 km away from domestic airport in Ludhiana and the nearest international airport is located in Chandigarh also Sri Guru Ram Dass Jee International Airport is the second nearest airport which is 121 km away in Amritsar.

References 

Villages in Jalandhar district
Villages in Nakodar tehsil